Trampled – The Elefant Traks Remix Album by various artists is the first compilation remix album via Australian hip hop label, Elefant Traks, and was released in August 2006. The label's artists remixed tracks by fellow label mates from the previous eight years.

The album was released as an 18-track CD, with three tracks from the CD also featuring on a limited edition 7-track vinyl 12" bonus disc, together with four additional remix tracks, by Astronomy Class, F&d (Mnemonic Ascent), Fame and Pasobionic.

On the album Plutonic Lab remixes Hermitude, who in turn remix The Herd. The Herd members such as Sulo, Unkle Ho, Traksewt and Urthboy remix the likes of TZU, Sparrow Hill and Waiting for Guinness. Co-nominees of Triple J's inaugural J Award Pivot recondition The Herd, as do Curse Ov Dialect and Combat Wombat. Count Bounce and Yerock (TZU) overhaul Urthboy, and "I Was Only 19"  is remixed by UK folktronica act Tunng.

In addition, the album version of The Herd's cover of "I Was Only 19"  featuring John Schumann is included, fulfilling the promise to core fans who had bought The Sun Never Sets album before it was re-released with the track.

Track listing (CD release)

 "No Disclaimers" (Curse Ov Dialect Remix) - The Herd 
 "The Show" (Unkle Ho 'Afterparty' Remix) - Waiting For Guinness 
 "Music from the Mind" (Unkle Ho 'Dubstretch' Remix) - Hermitude
 "Ray of Sun" (Sulo Remix) - The Herd 
 "Keep it Relevant" (Yerock Remix) - Urthboy 
 "Nightfall's Messenger" (Plutonic Lab Remix) - Hermitude 
 "Recoil" (Traksewt Remix) - TZU
 "Take My Hand" (Urthboy 'Where I Live' Remix feat. Toe-Fu & Jane Tyrrell) - Gauche 
 "The Locust" (Sulo Remix) - Sparrow Hill 
 "Slavgnostik" (Hermitude Remix) - Unkle Ho 
 "The Last Chance" (Count Bounce Remix) - Urthboy 
 "Corruption Dub (Chasm 'Corruption Bounce' Remix feat. The Tongue) - Combat Wombat 
 "Apocalypta" (Monkey Marc Remix) - The Herd 
 "Can't Breathe" (Hermitude Remix) - The Herd 
 "The Metres Gained" (Pivot 'Gallipoli' Remix) - The Herd 
 "I was only 19" (Tunng Remix) - The Herd 
 "A Formidable Marinade" (Unkle Ho 'Ho Hop' Remix) - Mikelangelo and the Black Sea Gentlemen 
 "I Was Only 19" (feat John Schumann) - The Herd

Track listing (Vinyl EP)

 "No Disclaimers (Curse Ov Dialect Remix) - The Herd 
 "Ruffwon" (Pasobionic Remix) - Hermitude 
 "Nightfall's Messenger" (Plutonic Lab Remix) - Hermitude 
 "Can't Breathe" (Hermitude Remix)- The Herd 
 "Effortless" feat. Braintax (F&d Remix) - The Herd 
 "Burn Down the Parliament" (Astronomy Class Version) - The Herd 
 "Qwest" (Fame Remix) - Combat Wombat

References

The Herd (Australian band) albums
Compilation albums by Australian artists
2006 remix albums
2006 compilation albums